The 1907 Nebraska Cornhuskers football team represented the University of Nebraska as a member of the Missouri Valley Conference (MVC) during the 1907 college football season. The team was coached by first-year head coach William C. "King" Cole and played its home games at Antelope Field in Lincoln, Nebraska.

Prior to the season, Nebraska joined the MVC, the first time since 1897 the Cornhuskers had been a member of a conference.

Schedule

Coaching staff

Roster

Game summaries

Peru State

Nebraska held Peru State without a first down in Cole's first game, also the first meeting between the teams.

South Dakota

Grinnell

at Minnesota

Nebraska scored first after a Minnesota fumble, but a pair of field goals gave the Golden Gophers the lead and another victory over NU.

Colorado

Iowa State

A second-half touchdown gave Nebraska a 10–9 win over Iowa State. On a late Cyclones field goal attempt, the ball hit the ground short of the uprights and bounced through. Because of this, Iowa State lists this game as a 13-10 victory.

at Kansas

This was Nebraska's only conference game in 1907, as the Cornhuskers had recently joined the MVIAA and were unable to schedule the other teams with such short notice. The 16–6 win gave NU a share of the conference title.

at Denver

Doane

The Cornhuskers shut out Doane 85-0, the largest margin of victory in Antelope Field history.

at Saint Louis

Saint Louis shut out Nebraska 34–0 in the only meeting between the teams.

References

Nebraska
Nebraska Cornhuskers football seasons
Missouri Valley Conference football champion seasons
Nebraska Cornhuskers football